The Afterlife with Suzane Northrop (often referred to as The Afterlife) is a Canadian English language documentary television series, which premiered on September 14, 2008 at 7:00 p.m. EST on the Canadian digital cable specialty channel, OutTV.

Premise
Each episode, medium Suzane Northrop along with host David Millbern, holds séances in an intimate studio setting with approximately 20 members of the LGBT community and their families in hopes of connecting with their deceased loved ones.

Broadcasters
 Canada - OutTV
 Netherlands - OutTV
 United States - here!

External links
 OUTtv show page
 Heretv show page

2008 Canadian television series debuts
OutTV (Canadian TV channel) original programming
2000s Canadian documentary television series
2000s Canadian LGBT-related television series
2000s LGBT-related reality television series
Canadian LGBT-related reality television series